Luisago is a comune (municipality) in the Province of Como in the Italian region Lombardy, located about  northwest of Milan and about  southwest of Como.

Luisago borders the following municipalities: Casnate con Bernate, Cassina Rizzardi, Fino Mornasco, Grandate, Villa Guardia.

Demographic evolution

References

External links
 www.comune.luisago.co.it

Cities and towns in Lombardy